Jennie Harris Oliver (March 18, 1864 – June 3, 1942) was an American author.

Born in Lowell, Michigan, Oliver became a school teacher and moved to Oklahoma in 1892. She was the poet laureate of Oklahoma from 1940 to her death in 1942. Her poems appeared in nationally circulated magazines such as Woman's World and Good Housekeeping, and her "Mokey Delano" stories were adapted by Metro-Goldwyn-Mayer into the 1942 film Mokey, starring Donna Reed, Robert Blake, and Billie Thomas. Oliver was extremely popular among Oklahoma writers and attracted many fellow authors to visit her at her home.  She died in Oklahoma City on June 3, 1942.

See also 

 Poets Laureate of Oklahoma

References 

1864 births
1942 deaths
20th-century American poets
20th-century American short story writers
20th-century American women writers
People from Lowell, Michigan
Poets from Oklahoma
Writers from Oklahoma
Poets Laureate of Oklahoma